Towhid Metro Station is a station of Tehran Metro Line 4. It is located in Tohid Square on top of Tohid Tunnel. It is between Enghelab Metro Station and Shademan Metro Station (formerly known as Azadi Station). The station was opened on 7 February 2011. The station will also serve Line 7 when it opens.

References 

Tehran Metro stations